The Vow of Louis XIII is an 1824 painting by Jean-Auguste-Dominique Ingres, now in Montauban Cathedral. The oil painting shows a vow to the Virgin Mary by Louis XIII of France. 

It was commissioned by France's Ministry of Interior in August 1820 for the cathedral of Notre-Dame in Montauban. The subject of the painting was to be Louis XIII's vow in 1638 to consecrate his kingdom to the Virgin in Her Assumption. When Ingres accepted the commission, he was living in Florence. Although he had experienced success as a portrait painter, his ambition was to establish a reputation in the more prestigious genre of history painting. He went to work with his usual diligence, and spent four years bringing the large canvas to completion.  

He traveled to Paris with it in October 1824. It was a critical success at that year's Salon and later established Ingres' reputation as the main representative of classicism, in opposition to the romanticism represented at the same Salon by The Massacre at Chios by Delacroix. Conceived in a Raphaelesque style relatively free of the archaisms for which he had been reproached in the past, it marked Ingres' grand return to the Paris art world after his years in Rome and Florence, and his abandonment of a more daring style. Ingres found himself celebrated throughout France. In January 1825 he was awarded the Cross of the Légion d'honneur by Charles X, and in June 1825 he was elected to the Institut de France.

Numerous life drawings and painted studies for the painting survive. A small oil sketch of the composition is in the Musée Ingres in Montauban. In 1855, Ingres repeated the figures of the Virgin and Child in a watercolor, Virgin and Child Appearing to Sts. Anthony of Padua and Leopold (Cambridge, Fogg Art Museum).

Gallery

References

Bibliography
 Arikha, Avigdor. J.A.D. Ingres: Fifty Life Drawings from the Musée Ingres at Montauban. Houston: The Museum of Fine Arts, 1986. 
 Condon, Patricia; Cohn, Marjorie B.; Mongan, Agnes. In Pursuit of Perfection: The Art of J.-A.-D. Ingres. Louisville: The J. B. Speed Art Museum, 1983. 
 Radius, Emilio. L'opera completa di Ingres. Milan: Rizzoli, 1968. 
 Rosenblum, Robert . Ingres, Paris, Cercle d'Art, coll. "La Bibliothèque des Grands Peintres", 1986. 
 Ternois, Daniel. Ingres, Paris, Fernand Nathan, 1980. 
 Tinterow, Gary; Conisbee, Philip; Naef, Hans. Portraits by Ingres: Image of an Epoch. New York: Harry N. Abrams, Inc., 1999.  

Paintings by Jean-Auguste-Dominique Ingres
1824 paintings
Louis XIII
Paintings of the Madonna and Child
Paintings in Montauban
Angels in art